32 King Street is the address of a historic warehouse building in King Street, Bristol, England.

It was built around 1860 and is now occupied by a restaurant. The contemporary 14 and 15 King Street are of similar design.

It has been designated by English Heritage as a grade II listed building.

References

See also
 Grade II listed buildings in Bristol

Grade II listed buildings in Bristol